Gur Mohammad (also Romanized as Gūr Moḩammad; also known as Tīzāb) is a village in Mirbag-e Jonubi Rural District, in the Central District of Delfan County, Lorestan Province, Iran. At the 2006 census, its population was 150, in 28 families.

References 

Towns and villages in Delfan County